Smolensky District is the name of several administrative and municipal districts in Russia:
Smolensky District, Altai Krai, an administrative and municipal district of Altai Krai
Smolensky District, Smolensk Oblast, an administrative and municipal district of Smolensk Oblast

See also
Smolensky (disambiguation)

References